Andrew Rambaut  is a British evolutionary biologist,  Professor of molecular evolution at the University of Edinburgh.

Education
Rambaut earned a Bachelor of Science degree in Zoology from the University of Edinburgh in 1993 followed by a DPhil in Zoology from the University of Oxford in 1997 supervised by Paul H. Harvey.

Career and research
He was based at Oxford until 2006, when he took up a Royal Society University Research Fellowship position and became Chair of Molecular Evolution at Edinburgh in 2010. 

Rambaut's research is primarily on the "evolutionary and epidemiological study of viral pathogens of humans and animals".

In 2007, he published a paper with Alexei Drummond describing BEAST (Bayesian evolutionary analysis sampling trees), a software package for evolutionary analysis by molecular sequence variation, which uses Bayesian inference techniques. This is freely available on GitHub. A year later, Rambaut set up Virological, an online "discussion forum for molecular evolution and epidemiology of viruses".

COVID-19 
Science reported on 11 January 2020 that Rambaut was the first to publish the genome of the COVID-19 coronavirus after it was sent to him by Edward C. Holmes. Holmes has said that it "took 52 minutes from receiving the code [from his Chinese colleague Professor Yong-Zhen Zhang] to publishing" on Virological. The BBC Horizon episode The Vaccine stated: "When Chinese scientists published the genetic sequence of a mystery new virus on January 10th 2020, vaccine scientists around the world immediately sprang into action".

Rambaut was one of the authors of the scientific paper The proximal origin of SARS-CoV-2, which concluded that "SARS-CoV-2 is not a laboratory construct or a purposefully manipulated virus".

Awards and honours
Rambaut was elected a Fellow of the Royal Society (FRS) in 2022, having been a Fellow of the Royal Society of Edinburgh (FRSE) since 2014.

Rambaut is an attendee of the UK's Scientific Advisory Group for Emergencies (SAGE).

References

British biologists
Living people
Alumni of the University of Edinburgh
Academics of the University of Edinburgh
Academics of the University of Oxford
Alumni of the University of Oxford
Fellows of the Royal Society
Fellows of the Royal Society of Edinburgh
British zoologists
Year of birth missing (living people)